Austre Moland (historic: Østre Moland) is a former municipality in the old Aust-Agder county in Norway. The roughly  municipality existed from 1838 until 1962 when it was merged with several neighboring municipalities to form the new municipality of Moland. It is now part of the municipality of Arendal in Agder county. The administrative centre was at Brekka where the Austre Moland Church is located.

History
The parish of Østre Moland was established as a municipality on 1 January 1838 (see formannskapsdistrikt law). According to the 1835 census the municipality had a population of 4,513.  On 1 January 1875, a small part of the town of Arendal (population: 22) was transferred to Østre Moland.

On 1 May 1878, Østre Moland was divided. The western portion became the municipality of Barbu (population: 4,874) and the southern part on the island of Tromøya became the municipality of Tromøy (population: 2,320). The remainder of Østre Moland was left with 2,524 inhabitants. On 1 July 1919 several things changed. The southern coastal district of Stokken (population: 1,683) was separated from Østre Moland to become a separate municipality, a small area in the neighboring Holt municipality (population: 14) was transferred to Østre Moland, and finally, the spelling of the name was changed to Austre Moland. After all of these changes, there were 1,289 residents left in Austre Moland. In 1936, a small area of Øyestad municipality (population: 33) was transferred to Austre Moland. In 1944, a small area of Austre Moland (population: 44) was transferred to the town of Arendal.

During the 1960s, there were many municipal mergers across Norway due to the work of the Schei Committee. On 1 January 1962, Austre Moland (population: 1,607) was merged with the municipalities of Stokken (population: 2,783), Flosta (population: 1,205), and the Strengereid area of Tvedestrand (population: 375) to form the new municipality of Moland. Later, on 1 January 1992, Moland municipality (population: 8,148) was merged into the neighboring municipality of Arendal (population: 12,478). The municipalities of Øyestad, Tromøy, and Hisøy were also merged into Arendal at the same time.

Name
The name comes from Old Norse word  which is derived from the river name , which can be linked with the Old Norse word  which means "brave". The word Austre and the older version Østre both mean "eastern" (in order to differentiate this location from the nearby Vestre Moland in another part of the county).

Government
All municipalities in Norway, including Austre Moland, are responsible for primary education (through 10th grade), outpatient health services, senior citizen services, unemployment and other social services, zoning, economic development, and municipal roads. The municipality was governed by a municipal council of elected representatives, which in turn elected a mayor.

Municipal council
The municipal council  of Austre Moland was made up of 17 representatives that were elected to four year terms.  The party breakdown of the final municipal council was as follows:

See also
List of former municipalities of Norway

References

External links

Population Statistics from Statistics Norway

Arendal
Former municipalities of Norway
1838 establishments in Norway
1962 disestablishments in Norway